During the 1929–30 English football season, Gillingham F.C. competed in the Football League Third Division South.  It was the 10th season in which the club competed in the Football League.  Gillingham finished 21st and the club was required to apply for re-election to the League.  The team lost in the first round of the FA Cup to Margate of the Kent League.

Forward Fred Cheesmur scored six goals in a match against Merthyr Town on 26 April 1930, a club record haul for a single match at a professional level which stands to this day.

Background

The 1929–30 season was Gillingham's 10th season playing in the Football League; the club had been one of the founder members of the Third Division in 1920, which had been re-branded the Third Division South a year later when a parallel Third Division North was created.  Gillingham had consistently struggled in the Third Division South and only once finished in the top half of the league table; in the 1928–29 season, the team had finished bottom and been required to apply for re-election to the Football League.  Shortly afterwards, former Gillingham player Dick Hendrie, who had most recently served as assistant manager at Brentford, was appointed as Gillingham's new manager, replacing Albert Hoskins, who had resigned in late March.

Hendrie signed nearly an entire team of new players, including half-back Jack Beacham and teenaged forward Thomas Brennan from his former club Brentford.  Four players joined from Scottish clubs, including goalkeeper Dave Smith from Hamilton Academical and full back John Geddes from Celtic.  Half-backs Albert Collins and George Bishop were signed from Millwall and Merthyr Town respectively.  New forwards joining the club included Fred Castle from Chesterfield and Fred Cheesmur from Charlton Athletic, as well as Jim McCafferty from minor Scottish club Shieldmuir Celtic and Campbell Whyte from Third Lanark.

Third Division South

August–December

Gillingham's first match of the season was at home to Walsall at Priestfield Road.  New signings Smith, Beacham, Collins, Bishop, McCafferty, Cheesmur and Castle all made their debuts.  Castle and Cheesmur scored the goals in a 2–1 victory for Gillingham.  The attendance of 8,160 would prove to be the largest crowd of the season at Priestfield Road.

January–May
In the penultimate game of the season, Gillingham beat Merthyr Town 6–0; Cheesmur scored all the goals.  It was the first time a Gillingham player had scored as many goals in a single game at a professional level and a record that stands to this day.  The final match of the season was at home to Luton Town; Cheesmur and John Speed scored in a 2–0 win.  Gillingham had ended the season with an unbeaten run of six games, comprising four wins and two draws, but still finished 21st in the division, ahead of only Merthyr Town.

Match details
Key

In result column, Gillingham's score shown first
H = Home match
A = Away match

pen. = Penalty kick
o.g. = Own goal

Results

FA Cup
Gillingham entered the 1929–30 FA Cup in the first round, and were paired with Margate of the Kent League, who had progressed from the qualifying rounds for the first time.  In what was seen as a significant upset, Gillingham lost 2–0 to their lower-level opponents and were eliminated from the competition.

Match details
Key

In result column, Gillingham's score shown first
H = Home match
A = Away match

pen. = Penalty kick
o.g. = Own goal

Results

Players

Twenty-seven players made at least one appearance for Gillingham during the season.  George Bishop and Fred Cheesmur made the most, each playing in 41 of the team's 43 competitive matches; four other players each played more than 30 times.  Ronald Baird was the only player to make just one appearance; he played against Coventry City in March, but it would prove to be the only game of his professional career.

Thirteen players scored at least one goal for Gillingham during the season.  Cheesmur was the top goalscorer with 17 goals; no other player reached double figures.

Aftermath
As a result of finishing 21st, Gillingham were required to apply for re-election for the second consecutive season, but were again re-elected.  In the following season, the team finished 16th in the Third Division South.

References

Works cited

Gillingham F.C. seasons
Gillingham